Jeep Wrangler Unlimited may refer to:

 4-Door Jeep Wrangler (JKU) (produced 2007–2018)
 2-Door long wheelbase Jeep Wrangler (TJ) (produced 2004–2006) or the jeep wrangler (TJ) nighthawk